Pokkunny is a village in Palakkad district, of Kerala, India. Pokkunny is an agricultural community, with mountains, ponds, irrigation canals, and paddies as parts of the landscape. The village is famous for the Pokkunny Appan (Lord Shiva) temple. Each year-end, the people celebrate Ayyapan Vilakku to show their devotion to their local god.

References
https://www.facebook.com/groups/pokkunnydesham/
https://www.facebook.com/groups/pokkunny shiva temple/
k.v.m.m.up school pokkunny
 youtube in pokkunny 

Palakkad